Eua Foou is a district of Eua division, Tonga. The population is 2,132.

References 

Eua